Anne S. Zickus (born April 6, 1939) is a former American businesswoman and politician.
From Palos Hills, Illinois, Zickus worked in the real estate business. She served on the Palos Hills City Council and was involved with the Republican Party. Zickus served in the Illinois House of Representatives from 1989 to 1991 and from 1993 to 2003.

Notes

1939 births
Living people
People from Palos Hills, Illinois
Businesspeople from Illinois
Women state legislators in Illinois
Illinois city council members
Republican Party members of the Illinois House of Representatives
20th-century American women politicians
20th-century American politicians
21st-century American women politicians
21st-century American politicians
Women city councillors in Illinois